Events in the year 2017 in Estonia.

Incumbents
 President: Kersti Kaljulaid 
 Prime Minister: Jüri Ratas

Events

Deaths

1 January – Aleksander Tšutšelov, sailor (b. 1933)
21 January – Veljo Tormis, composer (b. 1930)
13 May – Salme Poopuu, filmmaker and actress (b. 1939)
16 May – Arvo Kukumägi, actor (b. 1958) 
29 October – Aarne Üksküla, actor and theatre instructor (b. 1937)

See also
 2017 in Estonian football
 2017 in Estonian television

References

 
2010s in Estonia
Years of the 21st century in Estonia
Estonia
Estonia